Atala spa is an Italian manufacturer of bicycles and exercise equipment.

History 
The company was started by Angelo Gatti in 1907 and formally incorporated  in Italy in 1921 by Cesare Rizzato. It is notable for its racing bicycles, winning several championships in the early 20th century. The company won some championships in the 1980s before experiencing financial difficulties. Part of the company was sold in 2002. Now 50% of the company is owned by  the Accell Group.

The company also produces bicycles for the brands "Atala", "Carraro Cicli", "Whistle Bikes", "Maino" and 'Umberto Dei". The company won victories in the past years with the Atala Team

Models 

Street: SLR, SLR100, Outdoor, Norhtblack, Time out
Trekking: Distance, River, Discovery, Street, Travel, Bridge
Urban : Manhattan, Primavera, Città, Cruiser, Life, Venture, Airon, Maggie, Piccadilli, president
MTB: Shape D, Shape V, Spin, Planet D, Planet V, Wap, Replay, Stratos, My Flower, Cobra, Diablo, Dragon, Scorpion
Electric bicycle: E-Green, EcoLife, Ecofolding, EcoCity
Cid'z bikes
Folding Bikes

The company produces several models for the  Carraro Cicli, Whistle Bikes, and Maino e Umberto Dei brands.

Components 
The company produces "Byte"  bicycle parts which are used in several models of the brand.

See also

 List of bicycle parts
 List of Italian companies

References

External links 

  (Italian)
 Whistle Bikes website
 Carraro Cicli website
 Umberto Dei Bicycles website

Motor vehicle manufacturers of Italy
Motorcycle manufacturers of Italy
Scooter manufacturers
Moped manufacturers
Cycle manufacturers of Italy
Mountain bike manufacturers
Electric bicycles
Vehicle manufacturing companies established in 1907
Italian companies established in 1907
Italian brands